NHL 5-On-5 2006 is an NHL ice hockey video game released in 2005. The game was released on a number of mobile devices.

External links 
IGN

2005 video games
National Hockey League video games
Mobile games
Sports management video games
Windows games